A gambeson (also aketon, padded jack, pourpoint, or arming doublet) is a padded defensive jacket, worn as armour separately, or combined with mail or plate armour. Gambesons were produced with a sewing technique called quilting. They were usually constructed of linen or wool; the stuffing varied, and could be for example scrap cloth or horse hair. During the 14th century, illustrations usually show buttons or laces up the front.

An arming doublet (also called aketon) worn under armour, particularly plate armour of fifteenth- and sixteenth-century Europe, contains arming points for attaching plates. Fifteenth century examples may include mail goussets sewn into the elbows and armpits to protect the wearer in locations not covered by plate. German gothic armour arming doublets were generally shorter than Italian white armour doublets, which could extend to the upper thigh. In late fifteenth century Italy this also became a civilian fashion. Men who were not knights wore arming doublets, probably because the garment suggested status and chivalry.

Etymology

The term aketon, originally the medieval French , might be a loan from Arabic , meaning 'cotton' (definite article – " cotton").

History
Quilted leather open jackets and trousers were worn by Scythian horsemen before the 4th century BC, as can be seen on Scythian gold ornaments crafted by Greek goldsmiths. As stand-alone cloth armour, the European gambeson can be traced at least to the late tenth century, but it is likely to have been in use in various forms for longer than that. In Europe, its use became widespread in the thirteenth century, and peaked in the fourteenth and fifteenth centuries.

The gambeson was used both as a complete armour unto itself and underneath mail and plate in order to cushion the body and prevent chafing. Evidence for its use under armour does not appear until the mid twelfth century. It was very insulating and thus uncomfortable, but its protection was vital for the soldier.

Although they are thought to have been used in Europe much earlier, gambesons underwent a revolution from their first proven use in the late eleventh and early twelfth centuries as an independent item of armour to one that facilitated the wearing of mail, but it remained popular amongst infantry as cloth armour. Although quilted armour survived into the English Civil War in England as a poor man's cuirass, and as an item to be worn beneath the few remaining suits of full plate, it was increasingly replaced by the 'buff coat' – a leather jacket of rough suede.

There are two distinctive designs of gambeson: those designed to be worn beneath another armour, and those designed to be worn as independent armour. The latter tend to be thicker and higher in the collar, and faced with other materials, such as leather, or heavy canvas. This variant is usually referred to as padded jack and made of several (some say around 18, some even 30) layers of cotton, linen or wool. These jacks were known to stop even heavy arrows and their design of multiple layers bears a striking resemblance to modern day body armour, which substituted at first silk, ballistic nylon and later Kevlar as fabric.

For common soldiers who could not afford mail or plate armour, the gambeson, combined with a helmet as the only additional protection, remained a common sight on European battlefields during the entire Middle Ages, and its decline – paralleling that of plate armour – came only with the Renaissance, as the use of firearms became more widespread, until by the eighteenth century it was no longer in military use.

While the use of linen has been shown in archaeological evidence, the use of cotton – and cotton-based canvas – is disputed since large amounts of cotton cloth were not widely available in northern Europe at this time. It is quite probable that Egypt (and Asia-Minor generally) still produced cotton well after the 7th and 8th centuries and knowledge (and samples) of this cloth was brought to Europe by the returning Crusaders; however, the logistics and expense of equipping a town militia or army with large numbers of cotton-based garments is doubtful, when flax-based textiles (linen) were in widespread use.

Linothorax was a type of armour similar to gambeson used by ancient Greeks. Meanwhile, the Mesoamericans were known to make use of quilted textile armor called Ichcahuipilli before the arrival of the Spaniards. Another example is the bullet resistant Myeonje baegab that was created in the Joseon Dynasty in an attempt to confront the effects of Western rifles.

See also
 Doublet (a.k.a. pourpoint)
 Buff coat
 Jack of plate

References

External links

How a man shall be armed for his ease when he shall fight on foot a translation of the mid-fifteenth century treatise on armour, translated into modern English and accompanied by pictorial references.
 

13th-century fashion
14th-century fashion
15th-century fashion
Medieval armour
Western plate armour
Quilting